The men's bantamweight event was part of the boxing programme at the 1988 Summer Olympics. The weight class allowed boxers of up to 54 kilograms to compete. The competition was held from 17 September to 1 October 1988. 48 boxers from 48 nations competed. Kennedy McKinney won the gold medal.

Medalists

Results
The following boxers took part in the event:

First round
 John Lowey (IRL) def. Mustafa Saleh (IRQ), 5:0
 Vedat Tutuk (TUR) def. Edward Obewa (UGA) 3:2
 René Breitbarth (GDR) def. Magare Tshekiso (BTS), 5:0
 Felix Nieves (PUR) def. Samba Diallo (GUI), 5:0
 Jorge Julio Rocha (COL) def. Michael Hormillosa (PHI), RSC-3
 Justin Chikwanda (ZAM) def. Thomas Stevens (LBR), RSC-1
 Moumouni Siuley (NIG) def. Tiui Faamaoni (SAM), RSC-3
 Ibibongo Nduita (ZAI) def. Haji Ally (TNZ), 3:2
 Katsuyoki Matsushima (JPN) def. Saud Al-Muwaizri (KUW), RSC-1
 Jimmy Majanya (SWE) def. Mohammed Achik (MAR), 4:1
 José García (MEX) def. Tad Joseph (GRN), RSC-1
 Aleksandar Khristov (BUL) def. Peter Anok (SUD), 4:1
 Jung-Il Byun (KOR) def. Jean-Marc Augustin (FRA), 5:0
 Joilson Santana (BRA) def. Phetsmone Sonnavanh (LAO), 5:0
 Slimane Zengli (ALG) def. Manuel Gomes (ANG), 5:0
 Ndaba Dube (ZIM) def. Lionel Francis (ANT), RSC-2
 Alexander Artemev (URS) def. Edouard Paulum (VAN), walk-over

Second round
 Kennedy McKinney (USA) def. Erick Perez (GUA), RSC-1
 Shahuraj Birajdor (IND) def. Ayewoubo Akouatsi (TOG), 5:0
 Stephen Mwema (KEN) def. Rambahadur Giri (NEP), RSC-2
 Alberto Machaze (MOZ) def. Mike Deveney (GBR), 5:0
 Phajol Moolsan (THA) def. Marcus Priaulx (AUS), 5:0
 Abraham Torres (VEN) def. Teekaram Rajcoomar (MTS), 5:0
 Nyamaagiin Altankhuyag (MGL) def. Grzegorz Jablonski (POL), 3:2
 John Lowey (IRL) def. Mohamed Sabo (NGA), 4:1
 René Breitbarth (GDR) def. Vedat Tutuk (TUR), 5:0
 Jorge Julio Rocha (COL) def. Felix Nieves (PUR), 5:0
 Justin Chikwanda (ZAM) def. Moumouni Siuley (NIG), RSC-1
 Katsuyoki Matsushima (JPN) def. Ibibongo Nduita (ZAI), 5:0
 Jimmy Majanya (SWE) def. José García (MEX), 4:1
 Aleksandar Khristov (BUL) def. Jong-Il Byun (KOR), 4:1
 Slimane Zengli (ALG) def. Joilson Santana (BRA), 5:0
 Alexander Artemev (URS) def. Ndaba Dube (ZIM), RSC-1

Third round
 Kennedy McKinney (USA) def. Shahuraj Birajdor (IND), walk-over
 Stephen Mwema (KEN) def. Alberto Machaze (MOZ), 5:0
 Phajol Moolsan (THA) def. Abraham Torres (VEN), 3:2
 Nyamaagiin Altankhuyag (MGL) def. John Lowey (IRL), 3:2
 Jorge Julio Rocha (COL) def. René Breitbarth (GDR), 4:1
 Katsuyoki Matsushima (JPN) def. Justin Chikwanda (ZAM), 3:2
 Aleksandar Khristov (BUL) def. Jimmy Majanya (SWE), 5:0
 Alexander Artemev (URS) def. Slimane Zengli (ALG), 5:0

Quarterfinals
 Kennedy McKinney (USA) def. Stephen Mwema (KEN), 5:0
 Phajol Moolsan THA def. Nyamaagiin Altankhuyag (MGL), 5:0
 Jorge Julio Rocha (COL) def. Katsuyoki Matsushima (JPN), 3:2
 Aleksandar Khristov (BUL) def. Alexander Artemev (URS), 3:2

Semifinals
 Kennedy McKinney (USA) def. Phajol Moolsan (THA), RSC-1
 Aleksandar Khristov (BUL) def. Jorge Julio Rocha (COL), 3:2

Final
 Kennedy McKinney (USA) def. Aleksandar Khristov (BUL), 5:0

References

Bantamweight